The Fortune Hunter is a lost 1927 silent film comedy directed by Charles Reisner and starring Syd Chaplin. It is based on the 1909 Broadway play The Fortune Hunter by Winchell Smith. It was produced by Warner Brothers who released it with a Vitaphone soundtrack.

Cast
Sydney Chaplin as Nat Duncan
Helene Costello as Josie Lockwood
Clara Horton as Betty Graham
Duke Martin as Handsome Harry West
Thomas Jefferson as Sam Graham
Erville Alderson as Blinky Lockwood
Paul Kruger as Roland
Nora Cecil as Betty Carpenter
Louise Carver as Drygoods store owner
Bob Perry as Sheriff
Babe London as Waitress

Box Office
According to Warner Bros records the film earned $215,000 domestically and $119,000 foreign.

See also
List of early Warner Bros. sound and talking features

References

External links
 The Fortune Hunter at IMDb.com

1927 films
American silent feature films
Lost American films
Films directed by Charles Reisner
Warner Bros. films
American films based on plays
American black-and-white films
Silent American comedy films
1927 comedy films
1927 lost films
Lost comedy films
1920s American films
1920s English-language films